The 2018 Georgia Bulldogs football team represented the University of Georgia during the 2018 NCAA Division I FBS football season. The Bulldogs played their home games at Sanford Stadium and competed as members of the Eastern Division of the Southeastern Conference. They were led by third-year head coach Kirby Smart.

Georgia entered the 2018 season as defending SEC Champions and the previous season's national runners-up, and they were ranked third in the 2018 preseason AP Poll. The Bulldogs won their first six games by an average margin of victory of 30 points, but suffered their first loss on the road against LSU. The team rebounded with victories over No. 9 Florida and No. 11 Kentucky, and secured their place in the 2018 SEC Championship Game as champions of the East Division. The game was a rematch of the 2018 College Football Playoff National Championship against West Division champion Alabama, and the results of the games matched as Alabama once again came from behind to win the 2018 match-up. Georgia was left just outside the top four in the final CFP rankings, and they were invited to the Sugar Bowl to play Big 12 Conference runner-up Texas. The Bulldogs were upset by the Longhorns in that game 21–28, and finished the year with a record of 11–3.

The Bulldogs were led on offense by sophomore quarterback Jake Fromm, who finished the year with 2,761 passing yards and 30 passing touchdowns. Fromm finished in second in the conference behind Alabama's Tua Tagovailoa in passing touchdowns and passing efficiency rating (171.3). On the ground, D'Andre Swift and Elijah Holyfield each finished with more than 1,000 rushing yards, the second consecutive year that Georgia had two 1,000-yard backs. On defense, cornerback Deandre Baker was a consensus first-team All-American and the recipient of the Jim Thorpe Award.

Previous season
The 2017 Georgia Bulldogs football team finished the regular season 11–1 with the only loss coming on the road to Auburn. Key wins included defeating Notre Dame on the road in week 2. After winning the SEC East, Georgia won its first SEC Championship since 2005, defeating Auburn. Georgia was selected to play in the College Football Playoff for the first time in school history as the #3 seed to face the #2 seed Oklahoma in the Rose Bowl. In an instant classic, Georgia roared back from a 14-point halftime deficit to defeat Oklahoma 54–48 in double overtime, earning its first National Championship game appearance. In the National Championship, Georgia was defeated by Alabama 26–23 in overtime. Georgia finished the season 13–2.

Recruiting

2018 recruiting class

Preseason

Award watch lists
Listed in the order that they were released

SEC media poll
The SEC media poll was released on July 20, 2018, with the Bulldogs predicted to win the SEC East Division.

Preseason All-SEC teams
The Bulldogs had twelve players selected to the preseason all-SEC teams.

Offense

2nd team

D'Andre Swift – RB

Terry Godwin – WR

Isaac Nauta – TE

Andrew Thomas – OL

Lamont Gaillard – C

3rd team

Jake Fromm – QB

Defense

1st team

Deandre Baker – DB

J. R. Reed – DB

2nd team

Jonathan Ledbetter – DL

D'Andre Walker – LB

Specialists

1st team

Rodrigo Blankenship – K

2nd team

Mecole Hardman – RET

Schedule

Schedule Source:

Roster

Game summaries

No.22 Austin Peay

at No. 24 South Carolina

Middle Tennessee

at Missouri

Tennessee

Sources:

Vanderbilt

at No. 13 LSU

Florida

at Kentucky

Auburn

UMass

Georgia Tech

vs. Alabama (SEC Championship)

Sources:

Statistics

vs Texas (2019 Sugar Bowl)

Players drafted into the NFL

Rankings

References

Georgia
Georgia Bulldogs football seasons
Georgia Bulldogs football